Colin Dunne (born 8 May 1968) is an English-Irish dancer and choreographer who is a leading figure in the world of traditional Irish dance, as well as a theatre actor and contemporary dancer. Best known internationally for his performances and choreography in Riverdance and Dancing on Dangerous Ground, he transitioned to contemporary dance after earning an MA in that style as an artist-in-residence at the University of Limerick in 2002. In 2007, he was nominated for a UK Critics Circle National Dance Award (best male: modern dance) for performances at The Barbican in Fabulous Beast's production of The Bull. His first solo show, Out of Time, premiered in 2008.

Early life
Dunne was born in Birmingham, England, to Irish parents. He followed his two older sisters to Irish dance class at the local school, Birmingham's Comerford School, when he was just three years old. At the age of nine, he won his first World Championship title and was the first dancer to win the World, All England and All Ireland titles in the same year. From the age of 12, he was taught by Marion Turley in Coventry and when he retired from competition at the age of 22, he had won a total of nine World, eleven Great Britain, nine All Ireland and eight All England titles. At the age of 19, he was the youngest person ever to receive an Irish Post Award in recognition of his achievements in Irish dance.

Dunne graduated from Warwick University in 1989 with a BSc in Economics before going on to work as a trainee accountant at the Birmingham offices of Arthur Andersen. Around the same time, he passed his dance teachers exam (T.C.RG) and was teaching successfully with Marion Turley in Coventry and giving workshops in the United States, Australia and New Zealand. He resigned from Arthur Andersen on the day he qualified as a Chartered Accountant to go on a month long tour of Canada with The Chieftains.

Irish dance career
Between 1992 and 1995, Dunne toured regularly with musical groups The Chieftains and DeDannan. The former saw him begin a dance partnership with Jean Butler. The latter led to a memorable performance with Frankie Gavin and Stéphane Grappelli at Belfast's Ulster Hall, and then to a collaboration with American tap dancer Tarik Winston for the Irish Society St. Patrick's Day Ball in New York City in 1995. Six months later, Dunne would find himself working with both Butler and Winston in Riverdance.

Dunne joined the cast and creative team of Riverdance in October 1995. He was initially invited to choreograph and perform the newly commissioned number Trading Taps with Tarik Winston. However, with the departure of original male lead and choreographer Michael Flatley the day before the re-opening of the show at The Apollo in London, he found himself taking over the principal role at short notice. He toured with the production for three years, taking the show to its USA premieres in New York (Radio City Music Hall) and Los Angeles (Pantages Theatre), and also to Australia. His performances were recorded for the Riverdance: Live From New York City (1996) DVD. Further choreography credits for the production followed; Firedance (with María Pagés), Heartbeat of the World (with María Pagés) and Heartland Duet (with Jean Butler). Special TV appearances during these years include The Royal Variety Show (The Dominion London), The Kennedy Honours (Kennedy Centre Washington D.C.), and The Grammy Awards (including a duet with Savion Glover) at Madison Square Garden, New York.

In June 1998, Dunne left Riverdance to begin work on a new project with Jean Butler. In 2013, Dunne said, "I did over 900 performances. I left Riverdance because when you perform something 900 times in front of 3,000 or 4,000 people every night, I think a little piece of you dies off with every performance."

The new project, Dancing on Dangerous Ground, was based on the myth of Diarmuid Agus Grainne, and was produced by Harvey Goldsmith and Radio City Music Hall. The show received its World Premiere at The Theatre Royal Drury Lane in London in December 1999 and went on to perform to full capacity at Radio City Music Hall in March 2000. Although the show received critical acclaim in New York, it had failed to capture the imagination of audiences and critics in London. It closed in June 2000.

Crossover to contemporary dance
After an eighteen-month period living in New York, Dunne returned to Ireland in 2001 to take a position as dancer-in-residence at the University of Limerick at the invitation of Micheal O'Suilleabhain. In that year, he took the Masters in Contemporary Dance Performance. He began focusing on the creation of short solo works, and presented these solos at the Vail International Dance Festival in Colorado; Jubilee Auditorium in the Canadian city of Edmonton; and the Queen Elizabeth Hall in London. As part of his final MA, he choreographed "Headfoot" for the Daghdha Dance/Yoshiko Chuma production of 10,000 Steps which closed the first Dublin International Dance Festival in May 2002.

After finishing his Masters in 2002, Dunne sought collaborations with contemporary choreographers in parallel with his own solo creative work. In 2003, he worked again with Yoshiko Chuma in the Daghdha production of The Yellow Room. In 2005, he joined Michael Keegan Dolan's Fabulous Beast Dance Theatre for their production, The Bull. His performances in The Bull at The Barbican in 2007 earned him a nomination for a UK Critics Circle National Dance Awards (best male: modern dance). Other work during this period included choreography for The Abbey Theatre (The Shaughraun 2004), and performances with the Irish Chamber Orchestra (Tour of Ireland 2004 and Carnegie Hall 2005).

In January 2008, Dunne's first full-length solo show, Out of Time, premiered at Glór Irish Music Centre. The show displayed a love-hate relationship with the dance that made him famous. As of May 2016, his show was still touring the United States. In September 2016, Dunne's new collaborative show, "Edges of Light", began touring Ireland. In June 2017, "Edges of Light" premiered in New York. The show continued to tour as of July 2018.

In 2018, Dunne won a TG4 Gradam Ceoil award for Musical Collaboration as part of the production "Concert".

Personal life
As of November 2019, Dunne was living in Limerick, Ireland.

References

External links
 Dunne's official website 
 Colin Dunne at geocities.com
 "Dunne steps out with the ghosts of dance" at independent.ie
 "His Life After 'Riverdance' Is a Braid of Traditions" at nytimes.com

1968 births
Living people
Alumni of the University of Warwick
English male dancers
English people of Irish descent
National Dance Award winners
People associated with the University of Limerick
People educated at St Paul's College, Raheny
People from County Limerick
People from Birmingham, West Midlands
Performers of Irish dance
Irish stepdance